Tangy Loch, Kintyre, Scotland, is a small loch (lake) located in the centre of the peninsula. It is a Site of Special Scientific Interest. Tangy Loch Castle is a ruined fortification on an islet in the loch.

References

Kintyre
Lochs of Scotland